Orthogonius flavus is a species of ground beetle in the subfamily Orthogoniinae. It was described by Jedlicka in 1964.

References

flavus
Beetles described in 1964